is a Japanese softball player who won the gold medal at the 2008 Summer Olympics.

References

External links
 
 

1980 births
Living people
Japanese softball players
Olympic softball players of Japan
Olympic gold medalists for Japan
Olympic medalists in softball
Softball players at the 2008 Summer Olympics
Medalists at the 2008 Summer Olympics
People from Dazaifu, Fukuoka
21st-century Japanese women